The 2022 Detroit City FC season is the club's fourth professional season since the club was established in 2012. It is also the team's first season in the USL Championship.

Current roster

Coaching Staff

Transfers

For transfers in, dates listed are when Detroit City FC officially signed the players to the roster. Transactions where only the rights to the players are acquired are not listed. For transfers out, dates listed are when Detroit City FC officially removed the players from its roster, not when they signed with another club. If a player later signed with another club, his new club will be noted, but the date listed here remains the one when he was officially removed from the Detroit City FC roster.

In

Competitions

USL Championship

Eastern Conference

Matches

U.S. Open Cup 

As a USL Championship club, Detroit City FC entered the competition in the Second Round, played April 5–7.

Statistics 

|-
! colspan=14 style=background:#dcdcdc; text-align:center| Goalkeepers

|-
! colspan=14 style=background:#dcdcdc; text-align:center| Defenders

|-
! colspan=14 style=background:#dcdcdc; text-align:center| Midfielders

|-
! colspan=14 style=background:#dcdcdc; text-align:center| Forwards

|-
|}

Top scorers 
{| class="wikitable" style="font-size: 95%; text-align: center;"
|-
!width=30|Rank
!width=30|Position
!width=30|Number
!width=175|Name
!width=75|
!width=75|
!width=75|
!width=75|Total
|-
|rowspan="2"|1
|MF
|21
|align="left"| Maxi Rodriguez
|1
|0
|2
|3
|-
|FW
|29
|align="left"| Antoine Hoppenot
|3
|0
|0
|3
|-
|rowspan="2"|2
|DF
|15
|align="left"| Matt Lewis
|0
|0
|2
|2
|-
|FW
|19
|align="left"| Pato Botello Faz
|2
|0
|0
|2
|-
|rowspan="3"|3
|DF
|5
|align="left"| Stephen Carroll
|1
|0
|0
|1
|-
|FW
|11
|align="left"| Connor Rutz
|0
|0
|1
|1
|-
|MF
|12
|align="left"| Michael Bryant
|1
|0
|0
|1
|-

References

External links
 

American soccer clubs 2022 season
2022 in sports in Michigan